The Sony Vaio VGX series was a series of living room PCs created for Sony's Vaio line that were released from 2005 until 2008. The VGX series was aimed at consumers who wanted the flexibility of able to watch  TV and have the functionality of a computer at the comfort of their living room. All models came built-in with an HDMI port, VHF/UHF output, S-Video, Optical Audio port, and a variation of Microsoft Windows with Media Center installed.

VGX-XL Series

Models

VGX-TP Series

Models

References 

VGX
Computer-related introductions in 2005
Consumer electronics brands